Kona, Monarch of Monster Isle is a fictional American comic book character who was featured in his own self-titled series, published by Dell Comics in the 1960s.

Publication history
Kona debuted in Four Color Comics #1256 (dated February 1962) before his own self-titled series started a few months later with issue #2 (dated June 1962). Kona, Monarch of Monster Isle would run to issue #21 (dated June 1964). The series was plotted by Don Segall, scripted and drawn by Sam Glanzman. Later stories were scripted by Paul S. Newman.

Fictional character biography
Kona saves the lives of Dr. Henry Dodd, his daughter Mary and his grandchildren Mason and Lily after this group crashes their army surplus blimp on the prehistoric Pacific island that Kona calls home. Befriending them, Kona becomes their protector and saves them from many huge animals and monsters.

Dr. Dodd and his family eventually escape from the island, but later return to get Kona. After this Kona travels the world with them as their protector from the many huge monsters they encounter.

Reception
Comparing "Monster Isle" to another, more famous fictional land of monsters, Robert Michael Carter writes in The Great Monster Magazines, "Kona, Monarch of Monster Isle ripped off Burroughs and Pellucidar for 21 issues."

References

External links
Kona, Monarch of Monster Isle at Don Markstein's Toonopedia
comicbookresources.com Oddball Comics
Kona, Monarch of Monster Isle cover gallery

1962 comics debuts
1964 comics endings
Action-adventure comics
Dell Comics characters
Jungle superheroes
Jungle men
Fictional kings
Comics characters introduced in 1962
Dinosaurs in comic books
Comics set in Oceania
Lost world comics